The Conversion of Saul is a fresco painted by Michelangelo Buonarroti (c. 1542–1545). It is housed in the Pauline Chapel (Capella Paolina), Vatican Palace, in Vatican City. This piece depicts the moment that Saul is converted to Christianity while on the road to Damascus. 

Pope Paul III commissioned the work for the chapel of his namesake. The chapel was built by Antonio da Sangallo the Younger in 1537 to 1538 with the patronage of Pope Paul III Farnese to serve as storage for the consecrated Host, and as the place where cardinals gather to elect a new Pope.

Description
The figure of Christ is in the top left corner of the fresco. He is making a dramatic entrance into the scene, surrounded by a halo of light and a security detail of heavenly hosts. Some of these angels look on in awe and shock at the event occurring, while others act as a protective barrier between those things that are heavenly and divine and the earthly things below. A beam of light radiates from Christ down to a group of figures. This group is highly dramatized in their posing and expression. The most dramatic of these earthly figures is Saul himself. Saul has the face of an old man, though “we know and Michelangelo also knew it well that the calling of Saul on the road to Damascus occurred when he was about 30 years old." Saul's face reflects Michelangelo's own, who at this point was an old man also troubled by his faith. The figure of Saul represents “the human being in need of a greater light”.  Surrounding Saul is a triangular composition of companions that attempt to aid him as he lies recumbent on the ground. With one hand raised to shield himself from Christ, he has an expression of strange discomfort and fear. Most of the elements of this painting point towards the figure of Saul as being the main focus of the composition. The downward sloping hills, the beam of radiant light, and the groupings of the figures surrounding Saul make it clear to the viewer that he is the most important person in this figure-heavy piece. 

Further in the background is an outline of a city to contextualize the exact moment in which Saul is experiencing this divine intervention. On a journey to this city of Damascus in which he originally intended to arrest Christ followers, Saul was converted to Christianity. While Saul lies helpless on the ground, some of his companions begin to pull out weapons and shields as though they are evading an enemies attack. There is a tension to this scene that is only heightened by the individual expressions on each of the figures faces. The people on earth range from fearful to concerned. Even the angels above seem shaken by Christ's actions.

As in most of his pieces, Michelangelo pays careful attention to anatomy, and gives great detail to the musculature and form of all the figures, whether clothed or nude. Even the horse shows some muscularity as he recedes into the background, carrying a stray figure with him. Michelangelo's sources for anatomical knowledge were live models, dissections, and sculptures from antiquity. Anatomy played a very important role in his work and can be seen playing out in the Conversion of Saul. In his later works such as the Last Judgement and also in his Conversion of Saul, the muscularity of his figures have more of a strain to them than previous pieces. The muscles and anatomy seem contorted and elongated in ways that should not be natural and the figures are in impractical poses. Yet, this approach to anatomy works to enhance the drama of the piece. These poses and movements create a tension to the scene and highlight the miraculous nature of the event occurring.

Restoration
The work began restoration in 2002 and was finished in 2009. Methods included using a chemical solvent, ultrasonic curettes, and laser equipment. Restoration efforts revealed that Michelangelo not only painted in fresco, but he also painted in mezzo fresco and a secco. Mezzo fresco is a technique in which the artist paints the final, thin layer of plaster underneath the actual painting so that paint pigments only slightly penetrate the plaster. A secco is a technique in which the artist painted on dry plaster and was able to work more quickly and correct mistakes as opposed to other methods.

See also
List of works by Michelangelo

References
Elkins, James. “Michelangelo and the Human Form: His Knowledge and use of Anatomy.” Art History 7, no. 2 (June 1984): 176–186.

E. Wallace, William. “Narrative and Religious Expression in Michelangelo's Pauline Chapel.” Artibus et Historiae 10, no. 19 (1989): 107–121.

Kuntz, Margaret. “Designed for Ceremony: The Cappella Paolina at the Vatican Palace.” Journal of the Society of Architectural Historians 62, no. 2 (2003): 228–255.

de Tolnay, Charles. "The Final Period: Last Judgement, Frescoes of the Pauline Chapel, Last Pietas." Princeton: Princeton University Press, 1960. Vol 5

Notes

External links 

 

Religious paintings by Michelangelo
1540s paintings
Fresco paintings in Rome
Michelangelo
Paintings depicting Jesus
Horses in art